Bryan James Gilfillan (born 14 September 1984), is a footballer who plays as a defender or midfielder for Gretna 2008.

He represented Northern Ireland at under-21 level.

Club career
Gilfillan began his career with Inverness Caledonian Thistle in 2000, where he made a handful of substitute appearances before a loan spell at Brora Rangers in 2001. He later moved to Gretna, scoring 6 goals in 21 appearances, in a season that saw Gretna promoted to Division Two as Scottish Third Division 2004-05 champions. After a short spell at Stranraer and two years with Peterhead, Gilfillan went to Australia to play for Sunshine Coast in the Queensland State League. He returned to Scotland in December 2008, signing for Annan Athletic.

International career
Although he was born in Scotland, Gilfillan's mother's family come from Northern Ireland, and he was first called up their under-21 team in 2005.

References

External links

1984 births
Living people
People from Cardenden
Association football midfielders
Scottish footballers
Northern Ireland under-21 international footballers
Inverness Caledonian Thistle F.C. players
Cowdenbeath F.C. players
Gretna F.C. players
Stranraer F.C. players
Peterhead F.C. players
Annan Athletic F.C. players
Scottish Football League players
Clyde F.C. players
Airdrieonians F.C. players
Sunshine Coast F.C. players
Scottish expatriate footballers
Expatriate soccer players in Australia
Footballers from Fife
Brora Rangers F.C. players
Scottish expatriate sportspeople in Australia